Niobium monoxide is the inorganic compound with the formula NbO. It is a grey solid with metallic conductivity.

Structure and electronic properties
NbO adopts an unusual cubic structure, similar to the rock salt structure but with some missing atoms compared to it, so that both niobium and oxygen atoms have square planar coordination geometries. The niobium centers are arranged in octahedra, and there is a structural similarity to the octahedral niobium clusters in lower halides of niobium. In NbO the Nb-Nb bond length is 298 pm which compares to 285 pm in the metal. One study of the bonding concludes that strong and nearly covalent bonds exist between the metal centers.

It is a superconductor with a transition temperature of 1.38 K. It is used in capacitors where a layer of Nb2O5 is formed around NbO grains as the dielectric.

Preparation
NbO can be prepared by reduction of Nb2O5 by H2. More typically, it is prepared by comproportionation:
Nb2O5  + 3 Nb → 5 NbO

References

Cited sources

Niobium(II) compounds
Transition metal oxides
Crystals in space group 221